Guillermo Gutiérrez (born 8 June 1964) is a Mexican cyclist. He competed at the 1984 Summer Olympics and the 1988 Summer Olympics.

References

External links
 

1964 births
Living people
Mexican male cyclists
Olympic cyclists of Mexico
Cyclists at the 1984 Summer Olympics
Cyclists at the 1988 Summer Olympics
Place of birth missing (living people)
20th-century Mexican people
21st-century Mexican people